Philip Sankey (date of birth unknown, died 16 July 1992) was a Malaysian field hockey player. He competed in the men's tournament at the 1956 Summer Olympics.

References

External links
 

Year of birth missing
1992 deaths
Malaysian male field hockey players
Olympic field hockey players of Malaya
Field hockey players at the 1956 Summer Olympics
People from Ipoh